Thalaikoothal is a 2023 Indian Tamil-language neo-noir drama film directed by Jayaprakash Radhakrishnan and starring Samuthirakani, Kathir and Vasundhara in the lead roles. It was released on 3 February 2023.

Plot 
Pazhani is a middle-aged man living with his wife and daughter and taking care of his bedridden comatose father. His father had suffered an accident at his workplace where he was working as a mason with Pazhani. To care for his father and attend to his needs, Pazhani stops his work and starts going to night shift work as an ATM security. His wife is always angry with him and picking fights since she feels that he is neglecting her and his family as he’s always busy caring for this father. She must work at a matchstick factory due to Pazhani’ s low income to support herself and family and is irked by the factory supervisor’s moves to woo her at workplace. Pazhani has borrowed a large amount of money from the local moneylender who is his relative as well, to spend for his father’s treatment. The moneylender keeps hassling him to get the money back and settle his debts. His father in law suggests to perform Thalaikoothal on the ailing father since he’s been comatose for so long and is a burden now to the family to which Pazhani strongly disagrees. He had been consulting a local demigod to find any cure or blessing for his father and upon his advice, agrees to arrange a feast for the whole village if his father’s condition improves. One day eventually Pazhani’ s father opens his eyes from coma and starts recognizing people around him. Pazhani is elated and borrows money from the moneylender again to arrange feast for the whole village. He starts taking his father out to roam around and for frequent doctor visits. He also ends up pledging his house documents secretly to the money lender to meet the expenses.

The film progresses in a non-linear fashion with intermittent flashbacks from Pazhani’ s fathers youth days when he was in love with a lower caste washerman caste girl. In spite of the social pressure those days he gets close to her and decides to marry her. On the day of their marriage, Pazhani’ s grandfather attacks them and cuts off her finger before taking Pazhani’ s father away forcefully. Once the bedridden father of Pazhani recalls this incident from his life, he loses consciousness again and goes back to the comatose state. One day the money lender turns up at their house and tries to measure the house for selling it to someone when they’re interrupted by Pazhani’ s wife. She realizes that he had pledged the documents to the lender without informing her and gets into a fight with Pazhani, eventually leaving the house with their daughter.

His father in law and brother in law again visit Pazhani with the swami and informs him that his brother in law has taken the documents back from money lender after settling his full amount. They start pressurizing Pazhani to perform Thalaikoothal on his father since he has gone back to the coma state again without any hope for recovery. This time his wife also threatens to leave him for good if he does not agree. Under immense pressure also Pazhani does not relent and let them know that he wants to take care of his father without killing him. His wife and daughter leave his house and he have nightmares that day about his daughter. Eventually he decides to bring them back home and agrees to his in-laws to perform Thalaikoothal on his father. They come and give him oil bath, make him drink coconut water and makes him sleep on the floor overnight as per the standard procedure. When they see that he is still alive the next day, they bring someone who injects poison on Pazhani’ s father and kills him instantly. The funeral is arranged as if he passed away naturally and is cremated. Pazhani’ s father’s former lover, the washerwoman also comes to see his funeral and goes back unnoticed. A devastated Pazhani takes some of his father’s remains from the grave and plant a banyan tree with it. Pazhani and family relocate to the city for him to pursue his work when his daughter confronts him inside the bus about the Thalaikoothal incident which she came to know from her friend. The movie closes years later with Pazhani and his daughter spending time together below the now grown banyan tree.

Cast 
Samuthirakani as Pazhani
Kathir as the younger Muthu
Vasundhara
Katha Nandi as Pechi
Kalaiselvan as the older Muthu
Vaiyapuri
Murugadoss

Production 
Jayaprakash Radhakrishnan who earlier directed Lens began working on the project by early 2021, revealing that he had started a "village-based" film during an interview in March 2021. The film was officially announced in December 2021 by producers Y NOT Studios, with Samuthirakani, Kathir and Vasundhara announced as the film's lead actors. The title, Thalaikoothal, refers to a ritual that is practised in rural areas of Virudhunagar district in Tamil Nadu. It is a form of traditional involuntary euthanasia done to the elderly. The film was largely shot in Kovilpatti, with some schedules held in Kutralam and Tenkasi.

Reception 
The film was released on 3 February 2023 across Tamil Nadu. A critic from The Hindu wrote that the film was "simply outstanding", adding that "Jayaprakash’s poignant drama about a son’s fight to save his comatose father has brilliant performances, unbelievably great sound design, and stunning visual imagery that speaks of the value of a life". A critic from Times of India also gave the film a positive review, noting "overall, Thalaikoothal is definitely a socially-relevant film and explores the practice of senicide in the most convincing way".

References

External links 
 

 2023 films
 2020s Tamil-language films
Indian drama films